Pierina is a subtribe of cabbage whites, checkered whites, albatrosses in the family Pieridae. There are about 8 genera and 18 described species in Pierina.

Genera
These eight genera belong to the subtribe Pierina.
 Ascia Scopoli, 1777
 Ganyra Billberg, 1820
 Glutophrissa Butler, 1887
 Itaballia Kaye, 1904
 Leptophobia Butler, 1870
 Pieriballia Klots, 1933
 Pieris Schrank, 1801
 Pontia [Fabricius], 1807 (checkered whites)

References

Further reading

 
 
 
 
 
 
 

Pierini
Insect subtribes